Yizhuang may refer to: 

 Beijing Economic-Technological Development Area (Yizhuang Development Area), in Beijing
 Yizhuang, Beijing, area of Daxing District, Beijing
 Yizhuang Line, Beijing Subway
 Yizhuang railway station, station on the Beijing–Tianjin intercity railway
 Yizhuang, Xuzhou, town in and subdivision of Tongshan District, Xuzhou, Jiangsu